Porta a Porta (literally Door-to-door) is an Italian late night television talk show hosted by the Italian journalist Bruno Vespa and is broadcast on Rai Uno since 1996, lasting 23 seasons. Its first episode aired on January 22, 1996.

RAI original programming
Italian television talk shows
Current affairs shows
1996 Italian television series debuts
1990s Italian television series